The 1953–54 season was Fussball Club Basel 1893's 60th season in their existence. It was their eighth consecutive season in the top flight of Swiss football after their promotion from the Nationalliga B the season 1945–46. They played their home games in the Landhof, in the Wettstein Quarter in Kleinbasel. Jules Düblin was the club's chairman for the eighth successive season.

Overview 
René Bader continued as the team's player-coach, for the second consecutive season. Basel played a total of 41 games during their 1953–54 season. Of these 41 matches 26 were in the domestic league, one match was in the Swiss Cup and 14 were test or friendly matches. The test/friendly games resulted with five victories, one was drawn, but eight matches ended with a defeat. In total, including the test games and the cup competition, 16 games were won, three were drawn and 22 were lost. In their 41 games they scored 93 goals and conceded 111. A highlight in the test games was the match on 12 June against Brazil national team. This was the last test game before the 1954 World Cup.

There were fourteen teams contesting in the 1953–54 Nationalliga A, the last two teams in the table were to be relegated. Basel won 11 of their 26 games and drew twice, but lost 13 matches. They scored 55 goals and conceded 62. Basel ended the championship with 24 points in 8th position. They were 18 points behind La Chaux-de-Fonds who became Swiss Champions. Josef Hügi was the Basel's top league goal scorer with 30 goals and thus the league top goal scorer. Walter Bielser was the team's second best goal scorer with six goals, Kurt Thalmann scored five, Hans Weber scored four.

Basel joined the Swiss Cup in the 3rd principal round with a home match in the Landhof against Grenchen. The only goal of the match fell a couple of minutes before the final whistle and Basel were knocked out of the competition in this round.

Players 
The following is the list of the Basel first team squad during the season 1953–54. The list includes players that were in the squad on the day that the Nationalliga A season started on 16 August 1953 but subsequently left the club after that date.

 

 

 

Players who left the squad

Results 
Legend

Friendly matches

Pre-season and mid-season

Winter break to end of season

Nationalliga A

League matches

League table

Swiss Cup

See also
 History of FC Basel
 List of FC Basel players
 List of FC Basel seasons

References

Sources 
 Die ersten 125 Jahre. Publisher: Josef Zindel im Friedrich Reinhardt Verlag, Basel. 
 The FCB team 1953–54 at fcb-archiv.ch
 Switzerland 1953–54 by Erik Garin at Rec.Sport.Soccer Statistics Foundation

External links
 FC Basel official site

FC Basel seasons
Basel